is a Japanese light novel series written by Hajime Kamoshida, with illustrations by Kēji Mizoguchi. ASCII Media Works published 13 volumes between January 2010 and March 2014. A manga adaptation illustrated by Hōki Kusano was serialized ASCII Media Works' Dengeki G's Magazine and Dengeki G's Comic.

A drama CD was released in June 2012. A 24-episode anime television series adaptation by J.C.Staff aired between October 2012 and March 2013. It has been licensed by Sentai Filmworks in North America.

Plot
Sakura Dormitory is a dorm of the high school affiliated with Suimei University of the Arts (often shortened as Suiko), which hosts the strangest, most trouble-making students. After being kicked out of the normal dorm for keeping a stray cat, Sorata Kanda moves into Sakura Dormitory. As he starts to get used to the life in the dorm, Mashiro Shiina, a world-famous artist who cannot even take care of her daily life, moves in. Sorata is forced to become Mashiro's caretaker. The story is about their daily lives as well as mental growth.

Characters

Sakura Dormitory residents

Sorata is the male protagonist of the story. He is a second-year (later third year) student of Suiko, who lives in room 101 of Sakura Dormitory. He was kicked out of the regular dorms after he chose not to give up a stray cat he found (he cannot resist taking in stray cats, and he ends up keeping seven of them in his room). As many of the Sakura Dormitory residents have outstanding grades and art skills, he often feels plain and normal among them.
Chihiro, the dorm supervisor, chooses him to take care of Mashiro, the "pet girl" referenced in the title, and he is, understandably, reluctant to do so but ends up getting used to it. At the end of the thirteenth novel, he confesses to Mashiro. Sorata decides to become a computer game designer, but his game proposal to a famous computer game company is repeatedly turned down. In the sixth novel, he decides to make a game on his own. A major plot of the story is how his personality and self-expectation evolves.

Mashiro is the female protagonist of the story. She is the resident of room 202, as well as a world famous artist who transferred into Suiko as a second-year to learn how to draw manga. Although her artwork is widely admired, she knows nothing other than drawing and has an extreme lack of common sense and living ability. Due to this, Sorata is forced to "adopt" Mashiro and help her out with the basic tasks of everyday life that everyone else takes for granted; he even has to pick out underwear for her to wear or she will go out without them. Her focus on what she wants to do, draw manga, awes Sorata and inspires him. She has very bad grades, since she cannot pay attention in class, but she can still pass the make-up exams by photographically memorizing all of the answers with her art talent. In the third novel, Mashiro starts to develop feelings for Sorata and she even claims that she cannot live without him. According to Mashiro, she plans to live in Sorata's house and work as a manga artist after graduation.

Nanami is Sorata's classmate, who later moves into Sakura Dormitory's room 203. Although she is harsh to Sorata, she actually has a crush on him, and everyone aside from Sorata has noticed this. She left her home to become a voice actress without her parents' consent, and has to live on her own. After she finds herself low on money, as well as noticing that Sorata and Mashiro are becoming close, she chooses to move into Sakura Dormitory, which is more affordable than standard student housing. She meets Sorata's mother in the fifth novel and earns the latter's admiration. Sorata's mother even tells him that she would welcome Nanami as a daughter-in-law. In the sixth novel, she fails her voice actor tryout and decides to reconcile with her parents before deciding her next step. She is able to convince her parents to let her continue her VA studies and returns to Sakura Dormitory for her final year of high school. She speaks with a Kansai dialect when she is angry or flustered.

Misaki is the resident of room 201, a third-year-student of Suiko who later attends Suimei University of the Arts. She is very outgoing and optimistic and Sorata often refers to her as an "alien". She has very good grades and is very good at drawing, but the school decided to send her to Sakura Dormitory because she pays too much attention to drawing anime and manga. She is very good at animation and can handle the work required to make one without help from others. She has already sold an animation to a famous publishing company and made enough money off of it to live comfortably for the rest of her life. She has feelings for Jin, and openly expresses them, but Jin turns a blind eye to this and dates many other girls, which makes her very depressed. The two finally become a couple during the fifth novel. She moves out of Sakurasou after graduating and moves into the house next door which has a recording studio in the basement.

Jin is the resident of room 103 and a third-year student of Suiko. He is Misaki's childhood friend and has feelings for her, but he feels he is not good enough for her, so he ends up becoming a playboy. He has dated several girls, including Misaki's elder sister, but in the end he breaks up with all of them. He finally goes out with Misaki during the fifth novel. He wants to become a playwright/script writer worthy of her artistic talents, and chooses to attend a university in Ōsaka to achieve his goal. To pacify Misaki, he gives her a marriage registration form with his signature as a warranty that he will return, but Misaki signs and turns it in on the same day that he leaves for Ōsaka, which makes them officially married.

Ryūnosuke is the resident of room 102. Ryūnosuke is a second-year student of Suiko. He is a hikikomori who rarely leaves his room, and usually communicates with others by text message or e-mail. To reduce the need to personally communicate with others, he has written the "Maid" AI program, which responds to messages in his place. He is an expert of computer programming, and gives Sorata much useful advice about his computer game. According to Ryūnosuke, his ultimate goal is to have Maid become a real human. He has gynophobia, and will pass out when a girl touches him. This affliction becomes more severe after Rita falls in love with him and kisses him on the cheek. His favorite food is tomatoes, saying that he trusts tomatoes more than anything in the world. He is nicknamed "Dragon" by Misaki. During his middle school years, Ryūnosuke was a part of a game project made by his friends, but his intelligence was such that the others could not keep up with him and sidelined him from the project, resulting in Ryūnosuke becoming wary of forming friendship with anyone (including everyone in Sakura Dormitory). However, after a call from Rita, he manages to get over his fear of friendship and help his friends prevent Sakura Dormitory from being demolished.

Maid is Ryūnosuke's artificial intelligence program. Originally, Ryūnosuke designed Maid to filter and automatically reply to his cellphone messages and e-mails to save him time. However, Ryūnosuke keeps expanding Maid's AI ability. Maid is now capable of blocking and replying to a message or e-mail by her own preference, using new words she has recently learned from other messages, e-mails, or the Internet in the reply, anticipating people's emotions, writing computer or cellphone viruses and sending them out by herself, hacking into Suiko's computer network to steal information and even giving Sorata solid advice about his computer game program. The only way to distinguish Maid's messages from those of a human is that she replies too quickly. Ryūnosuke lets Maid enter a social networking service, with most people who meet her not realizing she is an AI program. According to Ryūnosuke, his ultimate goal is to give Maid an artificial body and become a real human.

As running the Maid program requires a lot of hard drive space and RAM, Ryūnosuke is forced to keep her working in the high standard server set in room 102 of the Sakura Dormitory, while giving orders and receiving the results via the Internet when he is absent from the room. On the computer, Maid is shown as a 3D model (designed by Misaki) on the bottom right corner of the screen, and will be shown using various tools and stationary depending on her current work. Maid appears to have a crush on Ryūnosuke, although it is unknown whether she has developed the feelings herself or if it is simply a part of her program design. After Rita falls in love with Ryūnosuke and kisses him, Maid starts a fight with her over the Internet since Ryūnosuke constantly lets Maid handle Rita's love letters and e-mails. Maid even asks Sorata to go to England and help her eliminate Rita.

Chihiro is an art teacher at Suiko and the dorm supervisor of Sakurasou. She is Mashiro's cousin and arranged for her transfer to Suiko. She once wanted to become a professional artist and was a conscientious student while attending Suiko herself. Unfortunately her dreams did not come true for unknown reasons and she became an art teacher. Despite being a teacher, she often gives Sorata improper advice. Perhaps due to her disappointment, she has become cynical and lazy, often foisting undesired tasks, such as looking after Mashiro, on the unfortunate Sorata. She appears to only be interested in drinking and trying to find a man.

Rita was Mashiro's roommate and caretaker when Mashiro lived in England. She became jealous of Mashiro's talent, and so advised Mashiro to draw manga hoping to see her fail, but later she regrets her actions and comes to Japan to bring Mashiro back to England. After realizing Mashiro's determination, she gives up and returns to England with Mashiro's father and starts studying art again. Even though he is cold to her, she falls in love with Ryūnosuke and kisses him on the cheek before leaving, which makes him pass out. Afterwards he ignores her and has his Maid AI handle all of her e-mails, which only fortifies her resolve. In the fifth novel, she visits Japan again to give Ryūnosuke Valentine's Day chocolate, and manages to kiss him on the lips, which makes him pass out again. She moves into Sakurasou after Nanami leaves.

Iori is Saori Himemiya's little brother and also a first-year student who starts living in Sakura Dormitory after Jin and Misaki graduate. He moves to Sakura Dormitory because he was caught peeking on the girls' bath. He has feelings for Kanna.

Kanna is a first-year student living in Sakura Dormitory after Jin and Misaki graduate. Despite having the highest score on the entrance exam, she moves to Sakura Dormitory because it was discovered that she sometimes does not wear her panties at school due to stress.

Suiko students

Yūko is Sorata's younger sister and is in her third year of junior high school; she later attends Suiko. She borders on having a brother complex and wants to be spoiled by Sorata. At first, she does not like any of the other girls because she thinks they are taking her brother away, but after spending time with them, she at least accepts Mashiro because she "has a few issues". However, she still dislikes Nanami because not only can she take care of herself, she also helped Sorata and Yūko's mother with many of the household chores during her stay at their home, garnering praise from their mother. She is quite air-headed and has a tendency to jump to conclusions about her brother and the other girls, mostly ending in perverse ways. She enters Suiko as a first-year student during Sorata's third year.

Daichi is Sorata's and Nanami's classmate. He has feelings for Nanami.

Mayu is Sorata's and Nanami's classmate.

Saori is a third-year student in the Music department who Misaki calls "Hauhau", and often produces music for Misaki's anime. She is in a relationship with Sōichirō.

Sōichirō is a third-year student and the President of the Student Council. He has known Jin for a very long time. He is in a relationship with Saori.

Otoha is an original character from the visual novel version. She is a first-year student of Suiko.

Kōichi is an original character from the visual novel version. He is a second-year student of Suiko.

Nanami's classmate and a member of their school's softball team.

Mashiro's classmate.

Others

Initially introduced as one of the judges for "Let's Make a Game", Kazuki is later revealed to be an alumnus of Suiko and lived in Sakurasou. It is hinted that he has feelings for Chihiro. Sorata idolizes him, and Kazuki admires Sorata's efforts. He later becomes Sorata's mentor and game adviser.

Ayano is Mashiro's editor for her manga and also a friend of Rita.

Fūka is Misaki's older sister. She is Jin's childhood friend and ex-girlfriend.

Koharu is the homeroom teacher of Sorata's class. She and Chihiro were acquaintances when they were in high school.

Sorata's father.

Sorata's mother.

Momoko is a voice actress and Nanami's friend.

Shiori is the driving instructor of Misaki.

Media

Light novels
The Pet Girl of Sakurasou began as a light novel series written by Hajime Kamoshida, with illustrations drawn by Kēji Mizoguchi. ASCII Media Works published 13 volumes in the series under their Dengeki Bunko imprint encompassing 10 main novels and three short story collections released between January 10, 2010, and March 8, 2014.

Manga
A manga adaptation, illustrated by Hōki Kusano, began serialization in the April 2011 issue of ASCII Media Works' Dengeki G's Magazine. The manga ended serialization in the magazine's May 2014 issue and continued serialization in Dengeki G's Comic between the June 2014 and July 2015 issues. The first tankōbon volume was released on October 27, 2011, and there have been eight published as of June 27, 2015. A four-panel anthology volume was published on February 27, 2012.

Anime

A 24-episode anime television series adaptation, produced by J.C.Staff, written by Mari Okada, and directed by Atsuko Ishizuka, aired in Japan between October 9, 2012 and March 26, 2013 on Tokyo MX. It has been licensed by Sentai Filmworks in North America, which re-released the series on Blu-ray with an English dub on August 25, 2020. The series was also simulcasted on Crunchyroll and is available for streaming on Hulu. The series makes use of five pieces of theme music: three opening themes and two ending themes. The first opening theme is  sung by Pet na Kanojotachi, consisting of Ai Kayano, Mariko Nakatsu, and Natsumi Takamori. The first ending theme "Days of Dash" is by Konomi Suzuki. Episode 3 uses the tune "Days of Dash", but different lyrics and accompanying animation than episodes 1 and 2. The opening theme of episode 14 is "I Call Your Name Again" by Nakatsu under her character name Nanami Aoyama. The anime only adapted up to volume 6 of the light novels.

Visual novel
A visual novel adaptation, developed by Netchubiyori and published by ASCII Media Works, was released on the PlayStation Portable and PlayStation Vita on February 14, 2013.

Reception
The Mainichi Shimbun reported in April 2012 that the novels have sold over 850,000 copies.

See also
 Just Because!—Original anime television series collaboration between Hajime Kamoshida and Tawawa on Mondays author Kiseki Himura
 Rascal Does Not Dream of Bunny Girl Senpai—Another light novel series by the same author

References

External links
 Official website 
 Anime official website 
 Visual novel official website 
 

2010 Japanese novels
2011 manga
2012 anime television series debuts
2013 video games
Animation making in anime and manga
Anime and manga based on light novels
Art in anime and manga
ASCII Media Works games
ASCII Media Works manga
Bishōjo games
Dengeki Bunko
Dengeki G's Magazine
J.C.Staff
Japan-exclusive video games
Kadokawa Dwango franchises
Light novels
Manga creation in anime and manga
PlayStation Portable games
PlayStation Vita games
Romance video games
Romantic comedy anime and manga
School life in anime and manga
Seinen manga
Sentai Filmworks
Television shows based on light novels
Television shows written by Mari Okada
Video games based on novels
Video games developed in Japan
Visual novels
Yonkoma